Google Volume One is a compilation of the first image shown by Google Images search for every word in the English-language dictionary. It comprises 1328 pages and contains over 20,000 images. It was published on 30 September 2014 and only 300 copies were made available.

Background 
Google Volume One, created by London-based artists Felix Hayes and Benjamin West (King Zog), used the Oxford English Dictionary and its 21,110 words as the base for the project. Editors David Desrimais and Mathieu Cénac of the Jean Boîte Éditions publishing company created software that simultaneously collected the first occurrences of every word in a Google Image Search. Their goal was to produce an inventory of Google's visual representation of all words at a single time. Since Google searches are constantly changing, the writers say it is near impossible to have one stable Google image for every word in the English language.>

Themes 
Google Volume One emphasizes how the values of society have been leveled by the internet. According to a L'Oeil Web Reviewer, Pauline Auzou, the Google Volume One project creates the theme that there is longer a difference between an artwork, an instruction diagram, or a product sold online because they are all the same in the domain of Google Images. The book is a representation of the intrinsic themes of the Digital Era.

Critical reception 
Since the process of re-assimilating the appropriation of content on the web is widely considered a work of art in the 21st century, Google Volume One has been praised for its digital artwork. Google Volume One won the "Price Edition" award at 45th Award Ceremony for Club of Artistic Directors.

References

External links 
 http://www.loeildelaphotographie.com/2013/11/27/web-review/23272/google-volume-1-king-zog-s
 https://web.archive.org/web/20151015214248/http://formfiftyfive.com/tag/google/

English dictionaries
Volume One
Image search